Saint-Ouen-l'Aumône is a railway station in Saint-Ouen-l'Aumône, a northwestern suburb of Paris, France. It is served by Transilien regional trains from Paris to Pontoise and from Pontoise to Creil, and by RER rapid transit.

See also
 List of stations of the Paris RER

External links
 

Railway stations in Val-d'Oise
Réseau Express Régional stations
Railway stations in France opened in 2000